Mira de Aire is a small town in Porto de Mós Municipality, in the district of Leiria, Portugal. The population in 2011 was 3,775, in an area of 15.62 km².

A point of interest is the Natural Park of Serra de Aire e Candeeiros. The area is known for its caves that attract many tourists.

Mira de Aire is located about an hour from Portugal's capital Lisbon.

References

External links 
Grutas Miradaire

Parishes of Porto de Mós